Sessa railway station is a railway station on Rangiya–Murkongselek section under Rangiya railway division of Northeast Frontier Railway zone. This railway station is situated at Kutuha Kachari Gaon, Sessa, Rangapara in Sonitpur district in the Indian state of Assam.

References

Railway stations in Sonitpur district
Rangiya railway division